The Men's Open International de Squash de Nantes 2017 is the men's edition of the 2017 Open International de Squash de Nantes, which is a tournament of the PSA World Tour event International (Prize money: $25,000).

The event took place at the naves with the Machines of the Isle in Nantes in France from 6 to 10 of September.

Grégoire Marche won his third Open International de Nantes trophy, beating Nicolas Mueller in the final.

Prize money and ranking points
For 2017, the prize purse was $25,000. The prize money and points breakdown is as follows:

Seeds

Draw and results

See also
Women's Open International de Squash de Nantes 2017
Open International de Squash de Nantes
2017 PSA World Tour

References

External links
PSA Open International de Squash de Nantes 2017 website
Open International de Squash de Nantes official website

2017 in French sport
2017 in squash
Open international de squash de Nantes